The Fort Bliss Pershing House was initially created as 'Army Plan Number 243, Field Officers Quarters', and is located at 228 Sheridan Road, Fort Bliss Texas built in 1910, and its National Register of Historic Places designation refers to its original designation of "Building 228 Commanding Officers Quarters / Garrison Commanders Quarters". The home was electrified in 1911, and from 1910 to 1914 was the residence of the post commander General Edgar Zell Steever II. During the Mexican Revolution it became the primary residence of General John J. "Black Jack" Pershing as both the General of the Armies and the Post Commander from the January 1914 to 1917. The home has hosted a number of famous guests, including Buffalo Bill Cody, Pancho Villa, Mexican General Álvaro Obregón, and former Mexican President General Victoriano Huerta. While the home was used as the Post Commanders residence for many years. Since its creation the house has been the residence of the post commander, up until alternate commanding general quarters were relocated during the World War 2 years, when the house was used to house members of the WAC (Women's Army Corps). Post World War 2, the home was delegated to house the Post Assistant Commander which it does to this day.

References

History of El Paso, Texas
Buildings and structures in El Paso, Texas
Houses on the National Register of Historic Places in Texas
National Register of Historic Places in El Paso County, Texas
Fort Bliss